Ağkilsə (also, Agkilisa) is a village in the Balakan Rayon of Azerbaijan.  The village forms part of the municipality of Sarıbulaq.

References 

Populated places in Balakan District